The 2010–11 season of 1. FC Kaiserslautern began on 13 August 2010 with a DFB-Pokal Match against VfL Osnabrück, and ended on 14 May 2011, the last matchday of the Bundesliga, with a match against Werder Bremen. Kaiserslautern were eliminated in the quarterfinals of the DFB Pokal, and finished 7th in the Bundesliga.

Transfers

Summer transfers

In:

Out:

Winter transfers

In:

Out:

Goals and appearances

|}
Last Updated: 14 June 2011

Competitions

Bundesliga

League table

Matches 

Note: Results are given with 1. FC Kaiserslautern score listed first.

DFB-Pokal

Note: Results are given with 1. FC Kaiserslautern score listed first.

See also
2010–11 Bundesliga
2010–11 DFB-Pokal
1. FC Kaiserslautern

Kaiserslautern
1. FC Kaiserslautern seasons